Andrew Rowan Summers (December 15, 1912– March 1968) was an American folk singer and player of the Appalachian dulcimer. He is credited with a large role in preserving Appalachian music from extinction. Summers was among the earliest musicians to draw attention to the dulcimer to a wider audience outside the Appalachians, with John Jacob Niles being one of the few earlier.

Summers was born in Abingdon, Virginia in 1912, and enrolled in the University of Virginia in 1930. Despite his interest in music, he ended up getting a degree in law, working as an attorney and later teaching at New York University.

Partial discography
All entries under Folkways Records
The Unquiet Grave (1951)
Seeds Of Love (single, 1951)
The Lady Gay (single, 1954)
Andrew Rowan Summers (1957) 	
Christmas Carols (1966)

References

Further reading
Sweet Singer of the Virginia Highlands: Andrew Rowan Summers. Virginia Cavalcade 1996 45(3): 100-109
http://media.smithsonianfolkways.org/liner_notes/folkways/FW02348.pdf

1912 births
1968 deaths
American folk singers
Appalachian dulcimer players
People from Abingdon, Virginia
University of Virginia School of Law alumni
20th-century American singers
Singers from Virginia
New York University faculty
Virginia lawyers
20th-century American lawyers